Dioptase is an intense emerald-green to bluish-green copper cyclosilicate mineral. It is transparent to translucent. Its luster is vitreous to sub-adamantine. Its formula is Cu6Si6O18·6H2O (also reported as CuSiO2(OH)2). It has a hardness of 5, the same as tooth enamel. Its specific gravity is 3.28–3.35, and it has two perfect and one very good cleavage directions. Additionally, dioptase is very fragile, and specimens must be handled with great care. It is a trigonal mineral, forming 6-sided crystals that are terminated by rhombohedra.

It is popular with mineral collectors and is sometimes cut into small gems. It can also be ground up and used as a pigment for painting.

History
Dioptase was used to highlight the edges of the eyes on the three Pre-Pottery Neolithic B lime plaster statues discovered at 'Ain Ghazal known as Micah, Heifa and Noah. These sculptures date back to about 7200 BC.

Late in the 18th century, copper miners at the Altyn-Tyube (Altyn-Tube) mine, Karagandy Province, Kazakhstan thought they found the emerald deposit of their dreams. They found fantastic cavities in quartz veins in a limestone, filled with thousands of lustrous emerald-green transparent crystals. The crystals were dispatched to Moscow, Russia, for analysis. However, the mineral's inferior hardness of 5 compared with emerald's greater hardness of 8 easily distinguished it. Later Fr. René Just Haüy (the famed French mineralogist) in 1797 determined that the enigmatic Altyn-Tyube mineral was new to science and named it dioptase (Greek, dia, "doubling" and optos, "visible"), alluding to the mineral's two cleavage directions that are visible inside unbroken crystals.

Occurrence
Dioptase is an uncommon mineral found mostly in desert regions where it forms as a secondary mineral in the oxidized zone of copper sulfide mineral deposits. However, the process of its formation is not simple, the oxidation of copper sulfides should be insufficient to crystallize dioptase as silica is normally minutely soluble in water except at highly alkaline pH. The oxidation of sulfides will generate highly acidic fluids rich in sulfuric acid that should suppress silica solubility. However, in dry climates and with enough time, especially in areas of a mineral deposit where acids are buffered by carbonate, minute quantities of silica may react with dissolved copper forming dioptase and chrysocolla.

The Altyn Tube mine in Kazakhstan still provides handsome specimens; a brownish quartzite host distinguishes its specimens from other localities. The finest specimens of all were found at the Tsumeb Mine in Tsumeb, Namibia. Tsumeb dioptase is transparent and often highly sought after by collectors. Dioptase is also found in the deserts of the southwestern US. A notable occurrence is the old Mammoth-Saint Anthony Mine near  Mammoth, Arizona where small crystals that make fine micromount specimens are found. In addition, many small, pale-green colored crystals of dioptase have come from the Christmas Mine near Hayden, Arizona. Another classic locality for fine specimens is Renéville, Congo-Brazzaville. Finally, an interesting occurrence is the Malpaso Quarry in and near Agua de Oro Argentina. Here tiny bluish-green dioptase is found on and in quartz. It appears at this occurrence, dioptase is primary and has crystallized with quartz, native copper, and malachite.

Use
Dioptase is popular with mineral collectors, and it is occasionally cut into small emerald-like gems. Dioptase and chrysocolla are the only relatively common copper silicate minerals. A dioptase gemstone should never be exposed to ultrasonic cleaning or the fragile gem will shatter. As a ground pigment, dioptase can be used in painting.  Dioptase dust is toxic due to its copper content and accidental ingestion can lead to serious health problems.

The most famous (and expensive) dioptase mineral locality is at Tsumeb, Namibia.

Crystal structure and properties
Dioptase is a cyclosilicate mineral consisting of Si6O18 rings which are linked together by Jahn–Teller distorted octahedral d9 Cu(II) ions. Each copper ion is coordinated by four cyclosilicate oxygens and two water molecules. Although the copper ions are six-coordinate, they can be viewed as square planar. The copper centers have approximately C4V symmetry. Each Cu(II) shares a square planar edge with another Cu(II) and corners with two more. The copper ions are responsible for the mineral's color and magnetic properties. A broad visible absorption band at 752 nm is observed. Dioptase is anti-ferromagnetic at low temperatures (Néel temperature of 70 K). Above 70 K, it obeys the Curie–Weiss law.

Gallery of dioptase mineral specimens

See also
Aventurine
Malachite

References

 Hurlbut, Cornelius S.; Klein, Cornelis, 1985, Manual of Mineralogy, 20th ed., 

Gemstones
Copper(II) minerals
Cyclosilicates
Trigonal minerals
Minerals in space group 148